Antonio Gaetano Pampani (c. 1705–1775) was a Venetian composer. He was chapel master to the conservatory of the Chiesa dell'Ospedaletto.

References

1700s births
1775 deaths
Year of birth uncertain
Italian male composers
18th-century Italian composers
18th-century composers
18th-century Italian male musicians